Marie Silin (born 4 October 1979) is a French politician from En Marche who was Member of Parliament for Paris's 12th constituency from 2020 to 2022.

References 

Living people
1979 births
La République En Marche! politicians
Deputies of the 15th National Assembly of the French Fifth Republic
Members of Parliament for Paris
Women members of the National Assembly (France)
21st-century French women politicians
People from Saint-Cloud